The 1991 ECHL All-Star Team was announced on March 9, 1991.

At this time, the ECHL did not hold an All-Star Game and would not hold their first such game until 1993.

Roster

References

ECHL All-Star Games
1990–91 in American ice hockey